Mirriam Mukape (born 4 August 1986) is a Zambian pop and R&B singer, actress and songwriter  who performs under the stage name Mampi. Her music is kwaito and reggae inspired. She is one of the most viewed Zambian female artists on YouTube.

Early life
Mampi was born in Lusaka on 4 August 1986. She started singing in church at the age of six. She undertook her primary education at Muyooma Basic School, and secondary education at Libala High School, and the Springfields Coaching Centre in Lusaka. At the age of 14 she lost her mother and then at 16 she lost her father. She found herself homeless at times and was not able to further her education. She cites prayer and  being taken in by a friend's sister is what got her through the tough times in her life.

Music and career

It was around the time of the loss of her brother and father, that Mampi was discovered by a music producer and signed a record deal in  2003. She released her first album Maloza in 2005 which included the song "Sunshya". She performed the song for her first appearance on National Television. Her second album, Chimo ni chimo, was released in 2007.
She performed in Namibia for the first time in 2012, at Windhoek.

In 2012 she released another album Natural Born Star.

In 2015  Portuguese singer, Luyanna, released a version of Mampi's hit track Walilowelela. The track still has Mampi singing some lines in Bemba and Nyanja while Luyanna sings other lines in Portuguese.

The track which was accompanied by a video that was heavily inspired by African culture. Though she did not appear in the video with Luyanna, the two appeared in a music video of a new version of a previously released track, Why by Mampi.

In December 2017 Mampi released the single "Nyula Yako"  from an album set that was released in 2018 of the same title. The dance hall inspired song was accompanied by a music  video.

In the same month, Mampi joined other African musicians including South African Award winning DJ Black Coffee to close off the year at the Vic Falls Carnival.

Big Brother Africa 
Mampi was a contestant during the seventh season of Big Brother Africa 7 as one of the celebrity housemates of the reality competition television series Big Brother Africa StarGame. Mampi was evicted from Big Brother Africa on 27 May 2012; she was in the house for 21 days. Big brother added to the celebrity of Mampi in Zambia among the female musicians.

Discography

Albums

Singles 

 Nyula Yako
 Rollercoaster
 Masobela Yatu
 Ubepele Fye
 Amama
 Inna Your Heart

Awards and Nominations 

 Best mainstream Female Artist - Zambia Music Awards
 Kwacha Music Awards
 Afrimma Award
 Ngoma Awards

References 

Living people
1986 births
People from Lusaka
21st-century Zambian women singers